James Powell Mattox (December 17, 1896 – October 12, 1973) was an American professional baseball player.

Another brother, Marv Mattox, was a teammate in college.

James played college football for the Washington and Lee Generals football team of Washington and Lee University. He was selected in 1919 to the College Football All-Southern Team. He made the field goal to upset Georgia Tech.

Mattox was later a catcher for the Pittsburgh Pirates from 1922 to 1923. He was then sold to the Wichita Falls club.

References

External links

Baseball catchers
Pittsburgh Pirates players
All-Southern college football players
American football quarterbacks
Washington and Lee Generals football players
1890s births
1973 deaths
Major League Baseball catchers
Baseball players from South Carolina